Ramalingeswara Swamy Temple, located in Santharavuru, Prakasam district, Andhra Pradesh is dedicated to the deity Ramalingeswara (the Hindu god Shiva). The temple dates back to the Chola period (12th century AD). According to The Hindu the temple administrators claim that the temple has a bell that reverberates 108 times when struck once, and that there are only two such bells the other being at Kashi.

References 

Shiva temples in Andhra Pradesh
Hindu temples in Prakasam district
12th-century Hindu temples